Carlos Gómez (born 21 February 1994) is a Spanish footballer who currently plays as a midfielder.

References

External links
 
 Profile at Young Harris Athletics

1994 births
Living people
Young Harris Mountain Lions men's soccer players
Tormenta FC players
Greenville Triumph SC players
Forward Madison FC players
USL League One players
USL League Two players
Spanish footballers
Association football midfielders
Footballers from Madrid
Spanish expatriate sportspeople in the United States
Spanish expatriate footballers
Expatriate soccer players in the United States